The 2020 Balkan Athletics Indoor Championships was the 25th edition of the annual indoor track and field competition for athletes from the Balkans, organised by Balkan Athletics. It was held on 15 February at the Ataköy Athletics Arena in Istanbul, Turkey.

In a closely contested competition, Romania and Ukraine each won five gold medals. Turkey won the most medals overall, with a haul of 16, followed by Romania on 12. Romania won the most women's events, with five and also won the most women's medals in total, with five. Ukraine won the most men's events, with three, and Turkey won the most women's medals in total, with ten.

Medal summary

Men

Women

Medal table

References

Results
25th BALKAN INDOOR SENIOR CHAMPIONSHIPS Men. Balkan Athletics. Retrieved 2020-02-21.
25th BALKAN INDOOR SENIOR CHAMPIONSHIPS Women. Balkan Athletics. Retrieved 2020-02-21.

External links
Balkan Athletics website

2020
Balkan Athletics Indoor Championships
Balkan Athletics Indoor Championships
Balkan Athletics Indoor Championships
Balkan Athletics Indoor Championships
Balkan Athletics Indoor Championships
International athletics competitions hosted by Turkey
Sports competitions in Istanbul